46th meridian may refer to:

46th meridian east, a line of longitude east of the Greenwich Meridian
46th meridian west, a line of longitude west of the Greenwich Meridian